This is a list of Maldivian films released in 2019.

Releases

Theatrical releases

Television

See also
 List of Maldivian films of 2020
 List of Maldivian films of 2018
 Lists of Maldivian films

References 

Maldivian
2019